The St. Louis Surge is a professional women's basketball team based in St. Louis, Missouri. The Surge is a member of the Global Women's Basketball Association (GWBA) and plays home games at Washington University in St. Louis' Field House Complex.

History 

Founded in 2011, the Surge played seven seasons and won two national championships and five regional championships in the Women’s Blue-Chip Basketball League (WBCBL) before moving to the GWBA. The GWBA features five teams, and the Surge's owner, Khalia Collier, serves as the league's commissioner. The league aims to grow women's basketball by featuring teams in locations lacking the sport, and teams play games in university facilities, or in the case of the Wisconsin GLO, in the Wisconsin Herd's NBA G League arena. The Surge's current head coach is Duez Henderson, who was a four-year player for The University of Iowa.

Roster

References 

Women's Professional Basketball League teams
Surge
Basketball teams established in 2011
2011 establishments in Missouri
Women's sports in Missouri